Midford Valley Woods is a 60-acre (24.6-hectare) biological Site of Special Scientific Interest between Midford and Limpley Stoke in Wiltshire, England, notified in 1975.

Sources

 Natural England citation sheet for the site (accessed 7 April 2022)

External links
 Natural England website (SSSI information)

Sites of Special Scientific Interest in Wiltshire
Sites of Special Scientific Interest notified in 1975